The 2011 Atlantic 10 men's basketball tournament was played initially at campus sites for the opening round on March 8, 2011 and subsequently at Boardwalk Hall in Atlantic City, New Jersey from March 11 through March 13, 2011.  It was the fifth consecutive year that the tournament is hosted in Boardwalk Hall.  The Richmond Spiders won the tournament and thereby received an automatic bid to the 2011 NCAA Men's Division I Basketball Tournament.

Seeding for the tournament was determined by the conference standings at the end of the regular season, with the last two teams in the standings not qualifying for the tournament.  First round games were held at the home of the higher (lower number) seed.

Richmond's victory was the first for the Spiders in ten years as members of the Atlantic 10 Conference, breaking Temple University's string of three consecutive conference tournament championships by defeating the Owls in the semifinals.

Richmond senior point guard Kevin Anderson was named Most Outstanding Player for the tournament, leading all scorers with 66 points over three games, including a game-high 23 points in the championship game.  Joining Anderson on the All-Championship Team were teammate Justin Harper, Dayton's Chris Wright and Chris Johnson, and Temple's Lavoy Allen.

The championship game was nationally televised on CBS.  Three first round games and both semifinal games were televised nationally by CBS College Sports, while all four quarterfinal games were offered by the network via syndication.

Tie-breakers
 Duquesne earned the 4th seed over George Washington with a 1–0 record in head-to-head games.
 Massachusetts earned the 8th seed over Dayton with a 1–0 record in head-to-head games.
 La Salle earned the 10th seed over St. Louis with a 1–0 record in head-to-head games.

Bracket

Asterisk denotes game ended in overtime.

References

Atlantic 10 men's basketball tournament
Tournament
Atlantic 10 men's basketball tournament
Atlantic 10 men's basketball tournament